The 2004 NCAA Division I-AA Football Championship Game was a postseason college football game between the James Madison Dukes and the Montana Grizzlies. The game was played on December 17, 2004, at Finley Stadium, home field of the University of Tennessee at Chattanooga. The culminating game of the 2004 NCAA Division I-AA football season, it was won by James Madison, 31–21.

Teams
The participants of the Championship Game were the finalists of the 2004 I-AA Playoffs, which began with a 16-team bracket.

James Madison Dukes

James Madison finished their regular season with a 9–2 record (7–1 in conference). One of their losses was to West Virginia of Division I-A. The Dukes, unseeded in the tournament, defeated Lehigh, second-seed Furman, and third-seed William & Mary to reach the final. This was the first appearance for James Madison in a Division I-AA championship game.

Montana Grizzlies

Montana finished their regular season with a 9–2 record (6–1 in conference). The Grizzlies, also unseeded in the tournament, defeated Northwestern State, New Hampshire, and Sam Houston State to reach the final. This was the fifth appearance for Montana in a Division I-AA championship game; they had won in 1995 and 2001, and lost in 1996 and 2000.

Game summary

Scoring summary

Game statistics

References

Further reading

External links
 Former JMU player prepares to watch team in national championship via YouTube

Championship Game
NCAA Division I Football Championship Games
James Madison Dukes football games
Montana Grizzlies football games
College football in Tennessee
American football competitions in Chattanooga, Tennessee
NCAA Division I-AA Football Championship Game
NCAA Division I-AA Football Championship Game